The locomotives were built and delivered by the Romanian plant "23 August" (now FAUR) - Bucharest under technical conditions of BDZ. Maximum interchangeability of aggregates, assemblies and parts with the class 76 machines, built in the same plant, was pursued. The main differences with them are:

 altered gear ratio, reducing the maximum speed in favor of traction;
 the number of engine cooling radiators has been increased;
 the way the engine is coupled with the hydro compound is changed;
 many parameters of the engine have been improved (driving mode, increased power output, etc.);
 more cabin controls, control devices, and more.

All class 77 locomotives are assigned to the Septemvri depot. This fully satisfied the needs for narrow-track locomotives at the then volume of traffic. Since the beginning of the 1990s there has been a drastic decline in transport. Then almost half of the locomotive fleet remained idle. A good way out of this situation was in 1996 the sale of 5 locomotives of the series. On March 20, 1996, the narrow gauge engines were loaded onto normal track wagons and transported to the port of Bourgas and loaded onto a ship with which they were transported to Argentina. There they were sold to serve a narrow-gauge railroad between the coal mines in the Rio Turbio village and the Rio Galegos port, about 200km in the Santa Cruz area of Patagonia. One of the remaining 5 locomotives was scrapped and the rest continue to work on the Septemvri–Dobrinishte narrow-gauge line.

Operational and Factory Data for Locomotives

Sources 

 Translated from Локомотиви БДЖ серия 77.000
 Димитър Деянов, Локомотивното стопанство на БДЖ 1947 – 1990, Sofia, 1993

References 

760 mm gauge locomotives
Narrow gauge locomotives of Bulgaria
B-B locomotives
FAUR locomotives
Railway locomotives introduced in 1988